Leptozestis gnophodes is a moth in the family Cosmopterigidae. It was described by Oswald Bertram Lower in 1904. It is found in Australia, where it has been recorded from Victoria.

References

Cosmopteriginae
Moths described in 1904